Fannin Memorial Monument may refer to:

 Goliad State Park and Historic Site (Goliad, Texas) monument by Raoul Josset, 1939
 Fannin Battleground State Historic Site (Fannin, Texas) monument